The Alfa Romeo Tipo 1035 is a naturally-aspirated, 3.5-liter, V-10 racing engine, designed and built by Alfa Romeo. It was originally specially designed for the Ligier Formula One team, but was later used in the experimental Alfa Romeo 164 Procar touring car, and the Alfa Romeo SE 048SP Group C sports prototype race car.

Engine design
In 1990, the Group C regulations underwent a major revamp, with the primary focus being on changing the engines to 3.5-litre units sourced from Formula One cars.

The project itself was a well-kept secret, and very little was ever revealed about the car's specifications.

Applications
Alfa Romeo 164 Procar
Alfa Romeo SE 048SP

References

Engines by model
Gasoline engines by model
Alfa Romeo
Group C
Formula One engines
V10 engines
Alfa Romeo in motorsport
Alfa Romeo engines